Onils Idrizaj (born 23 February 1991 in Vlorë) is an Albanian football player. The forward most recently played for Flamurtari Vlorë in the Albanian Superliga.

Honours

Flamurtari 
 Albanian Cup (1): 2013–14

References

1991 births
Living people
Footballers from Vlorë
Albanian footballers
Association football midfielders
Association football forwards
Flamurtari Vlorë players
KF Apolonia Fier players
FK Tomori Berat players
KS Sopoti Librazhd players
KF Bylis Ballsh players
Kategoria Superiore players
Kategoria e Parë players